The Gingoog–Claveria–Villanueva Road is a 71-kilometre (44 mi), two-to-four lane national secondary highway, connecting the municipalities of Villanueva and Claveria, and the city of Gingoog in Misamis Oriental. It serves as a diversion road from the Butuan–Cagayan de Oro–Iligan Road.

The entire highway is designated as National Route 955 (N955) of the Philippine highway network.

References 

Roads in Misamis Oriental